USS Pawnee may refer to the following ships operated by the United States Navy:

 , a screw sloop-of-war that served in the Union during the American Civil War
 , a harbor tug from 1898 to 1922
 , formerly named Monoloa II, a wooden hulled yacht used for minesweeping until 1921
 SS Pawnee (SP-1685), was designated by the Navy on 28 February 1917; under consideration for use as a cargo vessel on the coast of France; purchase of this ship was canceled in 1918
 ; an ocean tug that served through most of World War II

References

United States Navy ship names